North Head is an Australian National Heritage listed headland which includes the North Head Quarantine Station and has been symbolically regarded by ships arriving in Australia since 1788 as the entrance to Port Jackson, New South Wales

References

Headlands of New South Wales